Sheila Margaret MacRae (née Stephens; 24 September 1921 – 6 March 2014) was an English-born American actress, singer, and dancer.

Career
MacRae appeared in such films as Caged (1950), Backfire (1950), and Sex and the Single Girl (1964). On television, MacRae played herself in an episode of I Love Lucy, "The Fashion Show", in which she asks Lucy to participate in a Hollywood fashion show organized by Don Loper and featuring actors' wives as models.

In her first continuing role on television, between 1966 and 1970, MacRae played Alice Kramden on 52 episodes of The Jackie Gleason Show, taking over the role from Audrey Meadows. She went on to have her own short-lived television series (The Sheila MacRae Show), and to play Madelyn Richmond on the long-running soap opera General Hospital.

Personal life

Sheila Margaret Stephens was born in London in 1921, but evacuated with her parents to Long Island, New York in 1939, shortly before the onset of World War II. She finished high school when she was 15.

She married actor and singer Gordon MacRae in 1941; the couple divorced in 1967. They often appeared on the stage together in musicals such as Bells Are Ringing (in a 1964 production), and Guys and Dolls (as Miss Adelaide, a character that she took to Broadway in the 1965 revival). They were the parents of two daughters, actresses Heather and Meredith MacRae, and two sons, William Gordon MacRae and Robert Bruce MacRae. One of Sheila's four children, Meredith, predeceased her.

She later married Ronald Wayne, a television producer.

MacRae became a naturalized United States citizen on 20 March 1959 in California.

Death
MacRae, a devout Christian Scientist, died suddenly on 6 March 2014, in Englewood, New Jersey, aged 92, at the Lillian Booth Actor's Home. She had suffered from dementia, but was otherwise in good health and had been hospitalized for a minor surgical procedure, when her death came suddenly from natural causes, said her daughter, Heather. She was soon cremated.

References

External links
 
 

1921 births
2014 deaths
Actresses from London
British emigrants to the United States
American Christian Scientists
American female dancers
American women singers
American film actresses
American musical theatre actresses
American soap opera actresses
American television actresses
English female dancers
English women singers
English film actresses
English musical theatre actresses
English soap opera actresses
English television actresses
Naturalized citizens of the United States